The Liberty–White Railroad was chartered on December 22, 1902, and acquired the  narrow gauge logging railroad of the J.J. White Lumber Company running southwest from McComb, Mississippi.

A  branch was also built eastward from the J.J. White mill in South McComb to New Holmesville in 1907 and extended to Tylertown in 1912. J.J. White was notable for being one of the first Mississippi lumbermen to operate a private logging railroad in 1879.

The Liberty–White Railroad began experiencing financial difficulties after the J.J. White Lumber Company mill in South McComb closed in 1912 and was moved to Columbia, Mississippi. The  gauge line running southwest to Keiths was immediately abandoned, and the branch to Tylertown was abandoned December 1918.

The remaining  line from South McComb to Liberty was finally abandoned per Interstate Commerce Commission order September 23, 1921.

References

Defunct Mississippi railroads
Narrow gauge railroads in Mississippi
3 ft gauge railways in the United States